Hazaribagh Lok Sabha constituency is one of the 14 Lok Sabha (parliamentary) constituencies in Jharkhand state in eastern India. This constituency covers the entire Ramgarh district and part of Hazaribagh district

Assembly segments
Presently, Hazaribagh Lok Sabha constituency comprises the following five Vidhan Sabha (legislative assembly) segments:

Members of Parliament
1952: Babu Ram Narayan Singh, Chota Nagpur Santhal Parganas Janata Party
1957: Lalita Rajya Lakshmi, Chota Nagpur Santhal Parganas Janata Party
1962: Basant Narain Singh, Swatantra Party
1967: Basant Narain Singh, Independent
1968: Mohan Singh Oberoi, Indian National Congress (By Poll)
1971: Damodar Pandey, Indian National Congress
1977: Basant Narain Singh, Janata Party
1980: Basant Narain Singh, Janata Party
1984: Damodar Pandey, Indian National Congress
1989: Yadunath Pandey, Bharatiya Janata Party
1991: Bhubneshwar Prasad Mehta, Communist Party of India
1996: M. L. Vishwakarma, Bharatiya Janata Party
1998: Yashwant Sinha, Bharatiya Janata Party
1999: Yashwant Sinha, Bharatiya Janata Party
2004: Bhubneshwar Prasad Mehta, Communist Party of India
2009: Yashwant Sinha, Bharatiya Janata Party
2014: Jayant Sinha, Bharatiya Janata Party
2019: Jayant Sinha, Bharatiya Janata Party

Election Results

2019

2014

2009

See also
 Hazaribagh district
 Ramgarh district
 List of Constituencies of the Lok Sabha

Notes

External links
Hazaribagh lok sabha constituency election 2019 result details

Lok Sabha constituencies in Jharkhand
Hazaribagh district
Ramgarh district